Calycemorda is a genus of beetles in the family Mordellidae, containing the following species:

 Calycemorda brasiliensis Ermisch, 1969
 Calycemorda kamerunensis Ermisch, 1969

References

Mordellidae